Gaétan de Rassenfosse (born 1983 in Anderlecht, Belgium) is a Belgian economist, whose research is specialized in the field of economics of innovation. He is a professor at EPFL (École Polytechnique Fédérale de Lausanne), where he heads the Innovation and Intellectual Property Policy Laboratory at the College of Management of Technology.

Career 
de Rassenfosse graduated in 2006 as an Ingénieur de gestion from Solvay Brussels School of Economics and Management at Université libre de Bruxelles. He subsequently joined Bruno van Pottelsberghe to pursue a PhD in economics at Université libre de Bruxelles. In his PhD thesis he was able to provide empirical evidence on the price elasticity of the demand for patents. After receiving his PhD in 2010 de Rassenfosse joined the University of Melbourne as a research fellow, where he developed a novel way to count patents that has since been adopted by institutions such as the National Science Foundation.

Since 2014, he has been an assistant professor in economics of innovation at EPFL, where he is the director of the Innovation and Intellectual Property Policy Laboratory at the College of Management of Technology.

Research 
de Rassenfosse's laboratory performs empirical economic research in the following areas: intellectual property, patents, economics of innovation and science policy. His laboratory has documented the discrimination against foreigners in the patent system and has engaged in the production of open source data.

The laboratory's research was featured in various news outlets such as RTS, Le Temps, WBI, and Swissinfo.

Distinctions 
de Rassenfosse received the International Geneva Award 2019 by the Swiss Network for International Studies (SNIS), the McKinsey & Company Scientific Award 2010 and the CeFIP Academic Award 2008.

He is a scientific advisory board member of the Observatoire des Sciences et Techniques at the Haut Conseil de l'évaluation de la recherche et de l'enseignement supérieur in Paris, France. He acts as a co-editor at the Journal of Economics & Management Strategy.

Selected works

References

External links 
 
 Website of the Innovation and Intellectual Property Policy Lab

1983 births
Living people
Université libre de Bruxelles alumni
University of Melbourne alumni
Academic staff of the École Polytechnique Fédérale de Lausanne